Adrian Brzeziński (born 24 August 1998) is a Polish sprinter and long jumper. He won a bronze medal in the 4×100 m relay at the 2022 European Athletics Championships, setting a Polish national record of 38.15 seconds in the process. He is also a two-time national indor champion in the 200 metres, having won the event in 2019 and 2021.

References

External links
 

1998 births
Living people
Polish male sprinters
Polish male long jumpers
European Athletics Championships medalists